Karam Lehal ( Karam Sukhbir Singh ),born on 10 February 1994, in Sangrur, Punjab, India) is an Indian skeet shooter.

Background
Karam comes from one of the old respected noble families of jind state now in Sangrur, Punjab. Before being selected in the Indian Shooting team in 2012. He has also been into sports like boxing and horse riding at a state level.

Shooting career

In 2012 Lehal got selected in the Indian Shooting Team (juniors). Started by winning a bronze in the Jr. Men's skeet event at the 55th National Shotgun Championship held in Delhi the same year.

2013 gave a boost to Lehal's career. "The World Championship held in Peru in September 2013 was a turning point for me or more of an encouraging event for my career!" says Lehal. In the 57th National Shotgun Championship held in Delhi, Karam won a bronze in the individual Jr. men's skeet event whereas along with fellow shooters Angad Vir Singh Bajwa and Shinedeep Singh, the team bagged a gold.

In the 58th National Shotgun Championship Competitions held at Patiala, Punjab (November 2014) Lehal won the title of  "the National Junior Champion"  by winning two golds, one in the jr. men's skeet event over Anantjeet Singh Naruka, and the other in the jr. team men's skeet event.
 
A major achievement for the shooter has been his conquest over the gold in team men's skeet event and a bronze in the individual men's skeet event at the 4th Asian Shotgun Championship held at Al-ain, Dubai in 2014. Karam Lehal, Angad Vir Singh Bajwa and Smit Singh, teamed up to win gold in the Jr. Team Men's Skeet Event at the 35th National Games, Kerala (2015).

In the Inter-University 2015 Competitions, held at Punjab University Patiala, in the men's team event Lehal teamed up with Karanvir Singh Sekhon and Jai Dhaliwal  to win the championship by 193 points, leaving behind the teams of Punjabi University Chandigarh and Delhi University with 149 and 120 points respectively.

Karam Lehal, along with skeet shooters Karanvir Sekhon and Gurjot Khangura represented India at the World University Games 2015 (Gwangju Summer Universiade 15'). The team acquired 4th position in the Men's skeet event whereas Russia, Italy and Kazakhstan stood first, second and third respectively.

In the 59th National Shotgun Championship Competitions 2015, held at Jaipur, Karam Sukhbir Singh along with skeet shooters Gurjoat Siingh Khangura and Angad Vir Singh Bajwa claimed second position as a team whereas the Uttar Pradesh team led with 6 points, acquiring the gold.

Year 2016 gained Lehal a Bronze in the 36th North Zone Shooting Championship.

2017, seemed an year of comeback for Sukhbir, the young talent ranked 1st at the 27th All India G.V. Mavalankar Shooting Championship, 2017 held in Patiala whereas 4th in the 37th North Zone Shooting Championships held in Delhi. The 61st National Shooting Championship Competitions 2017, the consistency in Karam's performance reflected from him securing his position (6) amongst the top 9 all over India in skeet shooting.

In 2019 in the trails of  Punjab team selection Lehal shot 123/125  and made it to the team .
In 2019 the 63rd National Shooting Championship Competitions In Shotgun Events arranged in New Delhi - India, Karam along with Ganemat Sekhon held the second place in Skeet Mixed Team (ISSF) winning a silver. The Punjab team in the Championship also bagged the Gold, where in Karam in a partnership with Angad Vir Singh Bajwa and Gurjoat Siingh Khangura scored a total of 364 and he is In the  core group of top 9 shooters of the country with the average score  of 119. Lehal made it to the top 4 of the country in trails which held at Delhi in January 2021.

Medals
 2013, 55th National Shotgun Championship, Delhi (India) : Bronze - Individual
 2013, 57th National Shotgun Championship, Delhi (India) : Bronze - Individual
 2013, 57th National Shotgun Championship, Delhi (India) : Gold - Team
 2014, 58th National Shotgun Championship, Patiala (India) : Gold - Individual
 2014, 58th National Shotgun Championship, Patiala (India) : Gold - Team
 2014, 4th Asian Shotgun Championship, Al-ain (Dubai) : Gold - Team
 2014, 4th Asian Shotgun Championship, Al-ain (Dubai) : Bronze - Individual
 2015, 35th National Games, Kerala (India) : Gold - Team
 2015, 59th National Shotgun Championship, Jaipur (India) : Silver - Team
 2016, 36th North Zone Shooting Championship : Bronze - Individual
 2019, 63rd National Shooting Championship Competitions In Shotgun Events : Gold - Team

Ranking
 2017, 27th All India G.V. Mavalankar Shooting Championship : 1st - Individual
 2017, 37th North Zone Shooting Championships : 4th - Individual
 2017, 61st National Shooting Championship Competitions 2017 : 6th - Individual
 2019, 63rd National Shooting Championship Competitions In Shotgun Events : 2nd - Skeet Mixed Team (ISSF)

References
 http://www.thehindu.com/todays-paper/tp-sports/parampal-is-national-skeet-champ/article6631570.ece
 http://www.sportskeeda.com/shooting/smits-skeet-double-helps-punjab-pip-maharashtra
http://www.sportskeeda.com/shooting/smits-skeet-double-helps-punjab-pip-maha
https://www.tribuneindia.com/news/punjab/sangrur-shooter-selected-in-wc-skeet-team

https://www.thehindu.com/sport/other-sports/four-marksmen-share-the-top-spot-in-skeet/article33514256.ece/amp/

External links
 Karam Lehal at ISSF

1994 births
Living people
Indian male sport shooters